The 1992 Atlantic Coast Conference men's basketball tournament took place in Charlotte, North Carolina, at the second Charlotte Coliseum. Duke won the tournament, defeating North Carolina, 94–74, in the championship game.  Christian Laettner of Duke was named tournament MVP.  Florida State played in the ACC Tournament for the first time. The expansion to nine teams forced the addition of what would eventually become known as the "Les Robinson Invitational" because of NC State's multiple appearances in the Thursday game under coach Les Robinson. The 1992 tournament was the only time under Robinson the Wolfpack did not participate in the new "first-round" game.

Bracket

AP rankings at time of tournament

References
General
 
Specific

Tournament
ACC men's basketball tournament
College sports in North Carolina
Basketball competitions in Charlotte, North Carolina
ACC men's basketball tournament